This list of Florida's highest points in the state of Florida includes natural and manmade points.

Most of the state's highest named points are in Holmes, Walton, and Washington counties, in the sub-Piedmont highlands of northern Florida.  The highest points in peninsular Florida are found along the Lake Wales Ridge, running through the central portion of the peninsula, and the Brooksville Ridge, which parallels the northwestern coast of the peninsula.

Geographic points (permanent earthworks) of human origin are also included, designated as "N/A, Artificial".

References

MountainPeaks.net. Mountainpeaks.net, 2011.  Retrieved 2011-01-29.  
Notes: All Northern Florida Highlands peaks and Brooksville Ridge peaks except Citrus County High Point, Frazee Hill, Oak Hill, Pasco County High Point (Unnamed peak near Jessamine Lake Northeast), and Unnamed Peak southeast of Brooksville
MountainZone.  Mountainzone.com, 2010.  Retrieved 2011-01-30.  
Notes: All Northern Florida Highlands peaks and Brooksville Ridge peaks except Citrus County High Point, Frazee Hill, Oak Hill, Pasco County High Point (Unnamed peak near Jessamine Lake Northeast), and Unnamed Peak southeast of Brooksville
 Peakbagger.  Peakbagger.com, November, 2004.  Retrieved 2011-01-30.  
Notes: Polk County High Point, Unnamed Peak south of Camp Lake, Sugarloaf Mountain, Pasco County High Point (Unnamed peak near Jessamine Lake Northeast), Citrus County High Point, and Oak Hill 
 Topoquest.  Topoquest.com, 2008–2010.  Retrieved 2011-01-31.
Notes: Frazee Hill, Unnamed Peak southeast of Brooksville, and Unnamed Peak east of Jacks Lake

 
Highest points
Florida